Shah of Shahs can refer to:

 Shahanshah, a title meaning "Shah of Shahs"
 Shahanshah (disambiguation), other possible meanings of Shahanshah
 Shah of Shahs (book), a book by Ryszard Kapuściński